Upper moozhiyar dam is an Earthen Dam constructed across Moozhiyar River in Seethathodu village of Pathanamthitta district in Kerala,  India. This dam was constructed as a part of Sabarigiri Augmentation Scheme. The stream is located in southern side of Kakki reservoir. It is an embankment structure. 
 Sabarigiri Hydro Electric Project (340 MW) is the second largest hydro electric project of Kerala and is located in Pathanamthitta district. This dam is constructed for diverting the upper reaches of Moozhiyar river, a tributory of Pamba river to the Kakki -Anathode reservoir through a tunnel. The surplus over the storage flows over the rock cut spillway to Moozhiyar river. Taluks through which release flow are Ranni, Konni, Kozhencherry, Thiruvalla, Chengannur, Kuttanadu, Mavelikara, and  Karthikappally. Nearest city is Vandiperiyar.

Specifications 
Latitude : 9⁰ 17′ 00 ” N
Longitude: 77⁰ 08′ 00” E
Panchayath : Seethathodu
Village : Seethathodu
District : Pathanamthitta
River Basin : Pamba
River : Moozhiyar
Release from Dam to river: Moozhiyar
Dam Features
Type of Dam : Earthen
Classification : MH (Medium Height)
Maximum Water Level (MWL) : EL 985.00 m
Full   Level ( FRL) : EL 983.00 m
Storage at FRL : 0.035 Mm3
Height from deepest foundation : 
Length :  
Spillway : Flat- Ungated
Year of completion : 1979 
Crest Level : EL 983.00 m
Name of Project : Sabarigiri HEP
River Outlet : Not provided
Purpose of Project : Hydro Power
Officers in charge & phone No.Executive Engineer, 
Dam Safety Division No. I, 
Seethathodu, Pathanamthitta (Dist.), Kerala, PIN-689667 Phone-9446008424
Installed capacity of the project : 340 MW

References 

Dams in Kerala
Dams completed in 1979
20th-century architecture in India